Lycoming Engines is a major American manufacturer of aircraft engines. With a factory in Williamsport, Pennsylvania, Lycoming produces a line of horizontally opposed, air-cooled, four, six and eight-cylinder engines including the only FAA-certified aerobatic and helicopter piston engines on the market.

The company has built more than 325,000 piston aircraft engines and powers more than half the world's general aviation fleet, both rotary and fixed wing. Lycoming is an operating division of Avco Corporation, itself a subsidiary of Textron.

History

Sewing machines, bicycles and fashion

Lycoming dates its founding to 1845 by "Madame Ellen Curtis Demorest". However, the early history of the company (especially prior to 1860) is unclear; biographer Ishbel Ross notes that the marriage of Ellen Louise Curtis to William Jennings Demorest took place in 1858, somewhat later than the purported date of establishment of the company. A few years later in New York, between c. 1860 and 1887, the Demorests published fashion magazines and operated the Demorest Fashion and Sewing-Machine Company (sometimes known as the Demorest Manufacturing Company). They produced "Madame Demorest" and "Bartlett & Demorest" sewing machines and sold Ellen Demorest's innovative paper patterns for dressmaking. During this period, Ellen Demorest patented several fashion accessories, while her husband patented improvements to sewing machines and an apparatus for the vulcanization of rubber.

Around 1883, Gerrit S. Scofield & Frank M. Scofield (advertising agents from New York) bought the Demorest brand and the sewing machine business (the Demorests retained the magazine business), and constructed a factory in Williamsport, Pennsylvania (in Lycoming County). At the urging of the newly established Williamsport Board of Trade, citizens invested  in the new manufacturing facility, which employed 250 people. The factory produced 50 to 60 sewing machines per day.
With the development of the "New York Bicycle" in 1891 (designed by employee S. H. Ellis), the company diversified its product offerings. Until the early 1900s, the factory produced sewing machines, bicycles, typewriters, opera chairs and other products.

Engine manufacture

By 1907, the manufacture of sewing machines had become unprofitable for Demorest, and the company was sold and restructured as the Lycoming Foundry and Machine Company, shifting its focus toward automobile engine manufacture. In 1910, the company supplied its first automobile engine to Velie, and during the early post-World-War-I era, the company was a major supplier to Auburn (which produced the Auburn, Cord, and Duesenberg lines). By 1920, Lycoming was producing 60,000 engines a year, with a 2,000-strong workforce. To handle the capacity, a new foundry complex was built in Williamsport that year. Eventually Lycoming became Auburn's principal supplier, and in 1927 Errett Lobban Cord bought the company, placing it under his Auburn Manufacturing umbrella group. Among the engines Lycoming produced for Cord was an L-head straight-eight engine of 298.5 cu. in. displacement that produced 125 horsepower. This was used in the Cord L-29.  Lycoming also produced a double overhead cam straight 8 used in the legendary Duesenberg J series. This powerplant produced 265 horsepower, six times the power of a contemporary Model A Ford.  A supercharged version, generating 325 horsepower, was installed in the Duesenberg SJ and SSJ models.

In 1929, Lycoming produced its first aviation engine, the nine-cylinder R-680 radial. This was a fairly successful design, and was used widely in light aircraft, including Cord's Travel Air.

In the 1930s, Lycoming made a number of attempts to develop successful high-power aircraft engines. However, by the O-1230's entry into service, it had been surpassed by other designs and the  investment was not recouped. Another attempt was made to rescue the design by stacking two O-1230s to make the  H engine H-2470 but the only design to use it, the Vultee XP-54, never entered production. The Curtiss XF14C was originally intended to be powered by the H-2470, but the engine's poor performance led to the adoption of an alternative radial engine on the prototype. (The XF14C did not enter production.)

Undeterred by the O-1230/H-2470's failure, Lycoming turned to an even larger design, the 36-cylinder XR-7755, the largest aviation piston engine ever built. This design also experienced problems, and was only ready for use at the very end of World War II, when the aviation world was turning to turbojets and turboprop engines to power future large aircraft. There was apparently some interest in using it on the Convair B-36 Peacemaker bomber, but the 28-cylinder Pratt & Whitney R-4360 Wasp Major four-bank radial was used instead.

Through the 1920s and -30s, Lycoming had still been supplying automotive manufacturers with engines. However, these clients each slowly went out of business or switched to Continental engines for their vehicles. By 1931, the company was supplying automotive engines to only three companies: Auburn, Cord and Duesenburg, still all under the control of Cord. These companies closed their doors in 1937, after which Lycoming switched to exclusively designing and producing engines for aviation. In the meantime, the Smith Engineering Corporation, an early manufacturer of controllable pitch propellers had been purchased by Cord and moved to Williamsport.

In 1939 Cord re-organized all of his aviation holdings into the AVCO group, at which point the engine manufacturing company became "AVCO Lycoming". It also leased the government-owned Stratford Army Engine Plant in Stratford, Connecticut, and produced Wright radials under license. After the war, this plant was converted to produce the T53 turboshaft engine, one of its more successful designs. From this point on the piston and turbine engine lines remained separate, with the piston lines being built in the original Williamsport factories, and turbines in Stratford.

By 1961, Lycoming produced 600 to 700 engines per month. Its most successful post-war products were a series of air-cooled flat-4 and flat-6 general aviation engines. Most famous among these are the O-235 and O-360 four-cylinder engines, and the O-540 six-cylinder engine. Many light aircraft are powered by versions of these engines, with power ratings in the  range. Engines in this series also include the O-320 four-, O-580 six- and O-720 eight-cylinder engines, and the advanced turbocharged and fuel-injected  TIGO-541 variant of the venerable (carbureted) O-540.

In the early 1980s, the general aviation market suddenly diminished and Lycoming's piston engine business was significantly impacted. Attempts were made to move some of the turbine production to Williamsport, but this led to a series of quality control problems and eventually it was abandoned.

Another attempt to rescue Williamsport was made in introducing the "radical" SCORE engine, a Wankel engine originally developed through a joint venture between Curtiss-Wright and John Deere. Curtiss-Wright lost interest in the design just as it was maturing and sold its interests in the project to Deere, which brought in Lycoming to sell the developed engine into the aviation markets. It was guaranteed a startup run by Cessna, also owned by Textron. Just as production was ready to start, Cessna announced it was halting its small-aircraft business for an indefinite period, and SCORE was cancelled. The remains of the Deere licenses were later purchased by Rotary Power International, which briefly produced a  version.

Textron purchased the company in 1985. In 1994, Textron sold the Lycoming Turbine Engine Division, located in Stratford, Connecticut, to AlliedSignal, who merged it with the Garrett Engine Division of AlliedSignal as part of AlliedSignal Aerospace, later becoming part of Honeywell Aerospace in 1999. Textron retained piston engine production in Williamsport.

Products
The aircraft piston engine prefixes are:

 A—Aerobatic (dry sump)
 AE—Aerobatic (wet sump)
 E—Electronic
 G—Geared (reduction gear)
 H—Helicopter
 I—Fuel injected
 L—Left hand rotation crankshaft
 M—Designed for unmanned drone
 O—Opposed cylinders
 R—Radial cylinders
 S—Supercharged
 T—Turbocharged
 V—Vertical installation (usually for helicopters)
 X—X-type engine
 Y—Experimental

Piston engines

Turbine engines

See also
 Continental Motors, Inc.
 Rotax
 Vericor Power Systems

References

Notes

Bibliography

External links

 Official website

Textron
Aircraft engine manufacturers of the United States
Motor vehicle engine manufacturers
Williamsport, Pennsylvania
American companies established in 1845
Manufacturing companies established in 1845
1845 establishments in Pennsylvania
Manufacturing companies based in Pennsylvania
1985 mergers and acquisitions
Engine manufacturers of the United States